Jeremy Michael Cummings (born November 7, 1976) is a minor league right-handed pitcher who last played in the Tampa Bay Rays organization in 2008.

In his best minor league season he went a combined 12-4 record and 3.76 earned run average in 26 games (18 starts) between the Double-A Springfield Cardinals and Triple-A Memphis Redbirds.

The following season, he was signed as a minor league free agent by the Philadelphia Phillies, and assigned to their Triple-A affiliate, the Scranton/Wilkes-Barre Red Barons. In his final start of the season, he pitched a no hitter.

At the All Star break, Cummings was 7-2 with a 2.82 ERA to earn himself an International League All Star nod. He only appeared in three games in the second half of the season before shutting it down in order to compete with the United States national baseball team at the 2008 Summer Olympics in Beijing. He and his team won the Bronze medal.

References

1976 births
Living people
Baseball players from West Virginia
Baseball players at the 2008 Summer Olympics
Olympic bronze medalists for the United States in baseball
Medalists at the 2008 Summer Olympics